The Borough of Basildon is a local government district in south Essex in the East of England, centred on the town of Basildon. It was formed as the Basildon District on 1 April 1974 from the former area of Basildon Urban District and the part of Thurrock Urban District that was within the Basildon New Town. The population of the district as of 2010 is about 172,000. The local authority is Basildon Borough Council. The council made an application for borough status in February 2010 and this was given approval that year, with Mo Larkin becoming the first mayor in October.

History
The Basildon District was created on 1 April 1974 as part of the local government reorganisation of the Local Government Act 1972. It comprised the former area of the Basildon Urban District and the part of Basildon New Town that had been in Thurrock Urban District.

Governance

Elections to Basildon Borough Council are held in three out of every four years, with one third of the 42 seats on the council being elected at each election. Both the Conservative and Labour parties have controlled the council at different times, as well as periods when no party has had a majority. The Conservative party controlled the council through a cabinet system of governance after winning a majority at the 2003 election. In May 2017 the council switched to a committee system with no party in overall control. The council is currently composed of the following councillors:

Parish and town councils
There are nine town, parish and village councils at present. They cover one quarter of the district and are:

Billericay Town Council
Bowers Gifford and North Benfleet Parish Council
Great Burstead & South Green Parish Council
Little Burstead Parish Council
Ramsden Bellhouse Parish Council
Ramsden Crays Parish Council
Noak Bridge Parish Council
Shotgate Parish Council
Wickford Town Council

Boundaries
To the north it borders the Borough of Chelmsford, to the east it borders the District of Rochford district, to the south east the Borough of Castle Point and to the west it borders the Borough of Brentwood. To the south the district has a boundary with the unitary authority of Thurrock.

Geography

The district has three main population centres. The towns of Billericay and Wickford are two of the areas which both have surrounding villages. Occasional proposals have been made to move Billericay and Wickford to other districts, leaving Basildon more focused on the new town.

The other, largest, population centre is commonly referred to as Basildon and comprises three original settlements: Laindon, Basildon and Pitsea (from west to east) which have merged with other minor settlements to form the New Town, which is a continuous urban area.

The remaining land, approximately half of the district is designated as green belt, has several sites of special scientific interest. Two are around Billericay and the remainder are to the south of Basildon New Town. There are also wildlife areas of varying sizes around most of the district, except in the East.

The source of the River Crouch is in the district. The river runs across the district, through Wickford before it leaves the district.

The district is linked well by road and rail with significant surrounding destinations, including London.

In the west of the Basildon district, the Dunton Plotlands is an area of small plots of land used as weekend cottages or smallholdings inhabited during the mid twentieth century.

List of settlements 
It contains the towns of:

 Basildon (the administrative headquarters)
 Laindon
 Langdon Hills
 Pitsea
 Vange
 Billericay
 Wickford

Villages within the district are:
 Bowers Gifford
 Crays Hill
 Dunton Wayletts
 Great Burstead
 Havering's Grove (part)
 Little Burstead
 Nevendon
 North Benfleet
 Ramsden Bellhouse
 Shotgate
 Great Berry

Regeneration plans
Basildon District is a prosperous business location and has in recent years seen significant inward investment and jobs growth. Throughout Basildon District there are major developments planned estimated to total nearly £2 billion. These include:

The regeneration of Basildon, Wickford, Pitsea, and Laindon Town Centres
A new Sporting Village and improvements to playing pitches and sports facilities throughout the District to make Basildon the Centre for Sport in South Essex. The sporting village is expected in 2010, and is being highly sought after as an Olympic training base for one of the top teams, including the Russians. Its combined benefits, of having some of the top facilities so close to London, including one of the few Olympic (50m) size pools in the UK, will make it a true asset to whatever team(s) use it.
The creation of a health and education research centre near Basildon and Thurrock University Hospital and FE College
Investment in the Basildon Enterprise Corridor, the largest business area in the Thames Gateway outside London, home to 45,000 jobs and over 5,000 businesses, including Ford, Selex, Visteon, Case New Holland, First Data Europe, International Financial Services Limited, RBS, and Starbucks
The creation of one of the largest wetland nature reserves in Europe in the Thames Marshes by the RSPB, Land Restoration Trust, Basildon District Council and Veolia
A strategic review of the District's housing, with investment in housing estates such as Craylands, Five Links and Felmores to create first class places to live

Coordinating and promoting this programme of investment is the Basildon Renaissance Partnership which was set up in 2003 by Basildon District Council. Its partners also include the East of England Development Agency, English Partnerships, Essex County Council, and the Thames Gateway South Essex Partnership with support from the Department for Communities and Local Government.

The BBC noted the council had decided to sell for £1 a plot of land it bought next to the golf course for £1m in order to build a 4 star hotel.  The Conservative leader described the sale as doomed to failure.

Transport
The district is connected to London and Southend via two train operators: c2c and Abellio Greater Anglia. The route operated by c2c is the London, Tilbury and Southend line. Three principal stations of the railway line are in the district: Basildon railway station, Laindon railway station and Pitsea railway station

The former Great Eastern service (now Abellio Greater Anglia) operates on the Shenfield to Southend Line. Trains stop at Billericay and Wickford railway station. At Wickford, the Crouch Valley Line diverges from the Shenfield to Southend line.

Three primary routes are within the district. The A127 goes through its centre, the A13 goes through the south-east at Pitsea. Both these primary routes connect the district with Greater London and Southend-on-Sea. At Bowers Gifford at a terminus of the A13's primary status there is a junction with the beginning of primary status for the A130 with runs along a small section of the western boundary of the district. The A130 connects the district with Chelmsford. The A129 is the major road link between Billericay and Wickford, which are linked via A-Roads to the urban area of Basildon, Pitsea and Laindon by the A176 and the A132, respectively.

Freedom of the Borough
The following people and military units have received the Freedom of the Borough of Basildon.

Individuals
 Max Whitlock: February 2016.
 Stuart Bingham: February 2016.
 Trudi Westmore-Cox: September 2019.
 Donald Sheppard: September 2019.

Military Units
 The Royal Anglian Regiment: April 2011.

Organisations and groups
 Basildon & Brentwood Clinical Commissioning Group: 27 May 2021.
 Mid and South Essex NHS Foundation Trust: 27 May 2021.
 North East London NHS Foundation Trust: 27 May 2021.
 Essex Partnership University NHS Foundation Trust: 27 May 2021.

 The East of England Ambulance Service NHS trust: 23 October 2021.

References

External links
 Basildon District Home Page
 Basildon Renaissance Partnership
 Basildon Heritage
 Basildon Borough History

 
Non-metropolitan districts of Essex
Boroughs in England